Musonius luctuosus is a species of beetle in the family Cerambycidae, and the only species in the genus Musonius. It was first described by Fairmaire in 1902.

References

Crossotini
Beetles described in 1902
Monotypic beetle genera